Atlantic City, sometimes referred to by its initials A.C., is a coastal resort city in Atlantic County, in the U.S. state of New Jersey. The city is known for its casinos, boardwalk, and beaches. Atlantic City inspired the U.S. version of the board game Monopoly, which uses various Atlantic City street names and destinations in the game. Since 1921, Atlantic City has been the home of the Miss America pageant. In 1976, New Jersey voters legalized casino gambling in Atlantic City, and the first casino opened in 1978.

As of the 2020 census, the city had a population of 38,497, a decline of 1,061 (−2.7%) from the 2010 census count of 39,558, which in turn reflected a decrease of 959 (−2.4%) from the 40,517 counted in the 2000 census. Atlantic City and Hammonton are the two principal cities of the Atlantic City-Hammonton metropolitan statistical area, which encompasses those cities and all of Atlantic County for statistical purposes and are part of the larger Delaware Valley (Philadelphia metropolitan area), the nation's seventh-largest metropolitan area as of 2020. 

The city was incorporated on May 1, 1854, from portions of Egg Harbor Township and Galloway Township. It is located on Absecon Island and borders Absecon, Brigantine, Egg Harbor Township, Galloway Township, Pleasantville, Ventnor City, and the Atlantic Ocean.

History

Settlement
For many years before the city's founding, the island site of the future settlement was the summer home of the Lenape Native Americans. While the precise date of the first permanent occupation of what came to be Atlantic City by European settlers has not been precisely determined, it is commonly thought that in 1783 Jeremiah Leeds first built and occupied an all year home on the island. However, it was not until 1850 that the idea arose to develop the location into a resort town and in early 1853 the name "Atlantic City" was adopted.

Because of its location in South Jersey, which hugs the Atlantic Ocean between marshlands and islands, Atlantic City was viewed by developers as prime real estate and a potential resort town. In 1853, the first commercial hotel, the Belloe House, which was built at the intersection of Massachusetts and Atlantic Avenues.

The city was incorporated in 1854, the same year train service began on the Camden and Atlantic Railroad. Built on the edge of the bay, this served as the direct link of this remote parcel of land with Philadelphia, Pennsylvania. That same year, construction of the Absecon Lighthouse, designed by George Meade of the Corps of Topographical Engineers, was approved, with work initiated the next year. By 1874, almost 500,000 passengers a year were coming to Atlantic City by rail. In Boardwalk Empire: The Birth, High Times, and Corruption of Atlantic City, "Atlantic City's Godfather" Nelson Johnson describes the inspiration of Dr. Jonathan Pitney (the "Father of Atlantic City") to develop Atlantic City as a health resort, his efforts to convince the municipal authorities that a railroad to the beach would be beneficial, his successful alliance with Samuel Richards (entrepreneur and member of the most influential family in southern New Jersey at the time) to achieve that goal, the actual building of the railroad, and the experience of the first 600 riders, who "were chosen carefully by Samuel Richards and Jonathan Pitney":

After arriving in Atlantic City, a second train brought the visitors to the door of the resort's first public lodging, the United States Hotel. The hotel was owned by the railroad. It was a sprawling, four-story structure built to house 2,000 guests. It opened while it was still under construction, with only one wing standing, and even that wasn't completed. By year's end, when it was fully constructed, the United States Hotel was not only the first hotel in Atlantic City but also the largest in the nation. Its rooms totaled more than 600, and its grounds covered some 14 acres.

The first boardwalk was built in 1870 along a portion of the beach in an effort to help hotel owners keep sand out of their lobbies. Businesses were restricted and the boardwalk was removed each year at the end of the peak season. Because of its effectiveness and popularity, the boardwalk was expanded in length and width, and modified several times in subsequent years.

The first road connecting the city to the mainland at Pleasantville was completed in 1870 and charged a 30-cent toll. Albany Avenue was the first road to the mainland available without a toll.

By 1878, because of the growing popularity of the city, one railroad line could no longer keep up with demand. Soon, the Philadelphia and Atlantic City Railway was also constructed to transport tourists to Atlantic City. At this point massive hotels like The United States and Surf House, as well as smaller rooming houses, had sprung up all over town. The United States Hotel took up a full city block between Atlantic, Pacific, Delaware, and Maryland Avenues. These hotels were not only impressive in size, but featured the most updated amenities, and were considered quite luxurious for their time.

Boom period

In the early part of the 20th century, Atlantic City went through a radical building boom. Many of the modest boarding houses that dotted the boardwalk were replaced with large hotels. Two of the city's most distinctive hotels were the Marlborough-Blenheim Hotel and the Traymore Hotel.

In 1903, Josiah White III bought a parcel of land near Ohio Avenue and the boardwalk and built the Queen Anne style Marlborough House. The hotel was a success and, in 1905–1906, he chose to expand the hotel and bought another parcel of land adjacent to his Marlborough House. In an effort to make his new hotel a source of conversation, White hired the architectural firm of Price and McLanahan. The firm made use of reinforced concrete, a new building material invented by Jean-Louis Lambot in 1848 (Joseph Monier received the patent in 1867). The hotel's Spanish and Moorish themes, capped off with its signature dome and chimneys, represented a step forward from other hotels that had a classically designed influence. White named the new hotel the Blenheim and merged the two hotels into the Marlborough-Blenheim. Bally's Atlantic City was later constructed at this location.

The Traymore Hotel was located at the corner of Illinois Avenue and the boardwalk. Begun in 1879 as a small boarding house, the hotel grew through a series of uncoordinated expansions. By 1914, the hotel's owner, Daniel White, taking a hint from the Marlborough-Blenheim, commissioned the firm of Price and McLanahan to build an even bigger hotel. Rising 16 stories, the tan brick and gold-capped hotel would become one of the city's best-known landmarks. The hotel made use of ocean-facing hotel rooms by jutting its wings farther from the main portion of the hotel along Pacific Avenue.

One by one, additional large hotels were constructed along the boardwalk, including the Brighton, Chelsea, Shelburne, Ambassador, Ritz Carlton, Mayflower, Madison House, and the Breakers. The Quaker-owned Chalfonte House, opened in 1868, and Haddon House, opened in 1869, flanked North Carolina Avenue at the beach end. Over the years, their original wood-frame structures would be enlarged, and even moved closer to the beach. The modern Chalfonte Hotel, eight stories tall, opened in 1904. The modern Haddon Hall was built in stages and was completed in 1929, at eleven stories. By this time, they were under the same ownership and merged into the Chalfonte-Haddon Hall Hotel, becoming the city's largest hotel with nearly 1,000 rooms. By 1930, the Claridge, the city's last large hotel before the casinos, opened its doors. The 400-room Claridge was built by a partnership that included renowned Philadelphia contractor John McShain. At 24 stories, it would become known as the "Skyscraper by the Sea". The city became known as "The World's Playground".

In 1883, salt water taffy was conceived in Atlantic City by David Bradley. The traditional story is that Bradley's shop was flooded after a major storm, soaking his taffy with salty Atlantic Ocean water. He sold some "salt water taffy" to a girl, who proudly walked down to the beach to show her friends. Bradley's mother was in the back of the store when the sale was made, and loved the name, and so salt water taffy was born.

Prohibition era

The 1920s, with tourism at its peak, are considered by many historians as Atlantic City's golden age. During Prohibition, which was enacted nationally in 1919 and lasted until 1933, much liquor was consumed and gambling regularly took place in the back rooms of nightclubs and restaurants. It was during Prohibition that racketeer and political boss Enoch L. "Nucky" Johnson rose to power. Prohibition was largely unenforced in Atlantic City, and, because alcohol that had been smuggled into the city with the acquiescence of local officials could be readily obtained at restaurants and other establishments, the resort's popularity grew further. The city then dubbed itself as "The World's Playground". Nucky Johnson's income, which reached as much as $500,000 annually, came from the kickbacks he took on illegal liquor, gambling and prostitution operating in the city, as well as from kickbacks on construction projects.

During this time, Atlantic City was led by mayor Edward L. Bader, known for his contributions to the construction, athletics and aviation of Atlantic City. Despite opposition, he had Atlantic City purchase the land that became the city's municipal airport and high school football stadium, both of which were later named Bader Field in his honor. He led the initiative, in 1923, to construct the Atlantic City High School at Albany and Atlantic Avenues. Bader, in November 1923, initiated a public referendum, during the general election, at which time residents approved the construction of a Convention Center. The city passed an ordinance approving a bond issue for $1.5 million to be used for the purchase of land for Convention Hall, now known as the Boardwalk Hall, finalized on September 30, 1924. Bader was also a driving force behind the creation of the Miss America competition.

In May 1929, Johnson hosted a conference for organized crime figures from all across America that created a National Crime Syndicate. The men who called this meeting were Masseria family lieutenant Charles "Lucky" Luciano and former Chicago South Side Gang boss Johnny "the Fox" Torrio, with heads of the Bugs and Meyer Mob, Meyer Lansky and Benjamin Siegel, being used as muscle for the meeting. Gangster and businessman Al Capone attended the conference and was photographed walking along the Atlantic City boardwalk with Johnson.

Nightclub era
The 1930s through the 1960s were a heyday for nightclub entertainment. Popular venues on the white-populated south side included the 500 Club, the Clicquot Club, and the Jockey Club. On the north side, home to African Americans in the racially segregated city, a black entertainment district reigned on Kentucky Avenue. Four major nightclubs—Club Harlem, the Paradise Club, Grace's Little Belmont, and Wonder Gardens—drew both black and white patrons. During the summer tourist season, jazz and R&B music could be heard into the wee hours of the morning. Soul food restaurants and ribs joints also lined Kentucky Avenue, including Wash's Restaurant, Jerry's and Sap's.

Decline and resurgence

Like many older East Coast cities after World War II, Atlantic City became plagued with poverty, crime, corruption, and general economic decline in the mid-to-late 20th century. The neighborhood known as the "Inlet" became particularly impoverished. The reasons for the resort's decline were multi-layered. First, the automobile became more readily available to many Americans after the war. Atlantic City had initially relied upon visitors coming by train and staying for a couple of weeks. The car allowed them to come and go as they pleased, and many people would spend only a few days, rather than weeks. The advent of suburbia also played a significant role. With many families moving to their own private houses, luxuries such as home air conditioning and swimming pools diminished their interest in flocking to the luxury beach resorts during the hot summer. Finally, the rise of relatively cheap jet airline service allowed visitors to travel to year-round resort places such as Miami Beach and the Bahamas.

The city hosted the 1964 Democratic National Convention which nominated Lyndon Johnson for president and Hubert Humphrey as vice president. The convention and the press coverage it generated, however, cast a harsh light on Atlantic City, which by then was in the midst of a long period of economic decline. Many felt that the friendship between Johnson and Governor of New Jersey Richard J. Hughes led Atlantic City to host the Democratic Convention.

By the late 1960s, many of the resort's once great hotels were suffering from high vacancy rates. Most of them were either shut down, converted to cheap apartments, or converted to nursing home facilities by the end of the decade. Prior to and during the advent of legalized gambling, many of these hotels were demolished. The Breakers, The Chelsea, the Brighton, the Shelburne, the Mayflower, the Traymore and the Marlborough-Blenheim were demolished in the 1970s and 1980s. Of the many pre-casino resorts that bordered the boardwalk, only the Claridge, the Dennis, the Ritz-Carlton, and the Haddon Hall survive to this day as parts of Bally's Atlantic City, a condo complex, and Resorts Atlantic City. The old Ambassador Hotel was purchased by Ramada in 1978 and was gutted to become the Tropicana Casino and Resort Atlantic City, only reusing the steelwork of the original building. Smaller hotels off the boardwalk, such as the Madison also survived.

Legalized gambling

In an effort at revitalizing the city, New Jersey voters in 1976 passed a referendum, approving casino gambling for Atlantic City; this came after a 1974 referendum on legalized gambling failed to pass. Immediately after the legislation passed, the owners of the Chalfonte-Haddon Hall Hotel began converting it into the Resorts International. It was the first legal casino in the eastern United States when it opened on May 26, 1978. Other casinos were soon constructed along the Boardwalk and, later, in the marina district for a total of nine today. The introduction of gambling did not, however, quickly eliminate many of the urban problems that plagued Atlantic City. Many people have suggested that it only served to exacerbate those problems, as attested to by the stark contrast between tourism intensive areas and the adjacent impoverished working-class neighborhoods. In addition, Atlantic City has been less popular than Las Vegas as a gambling city in the United States. Donald Trump helped bring big name boxing bouts to the city to attract customers to his casinos. The boxer Mike Tyson had most of his fights in Atlantic City in the 1980s, which helped Atlantic City achieve nationwide attention as a gambling resort. Numerous highrise condominiums were built for use as permanent residences or second homes. By end of the decade it was one of the most popular tourist destinations in the United States.

Sports betting 
On June 27, 2017, the United States Supreme Court agreed to hear Christie v. National Collegiate Athletic Association and heard oral arguments in December 2017. Then, on May 14, 2018, the Supreme Court ruled that the Professional and Amateur Sports Protection Act (PASPA) was unconstitutional. The act was overturned, allowing New Jersey to move ahead with plans to implement legalized sports betting.

Despite being the state to initiate the landmark ruling, New Jersey was actually the third state to legalize sports betting following Nevada and Delaware. Gov. Phil Murphy signed the legislation into law on June 11, 2018, prompting several casino brands to launch sportsbooks, particularly in Atlantic City.

Modern-day challenges

With the redevelopment of the Las Vegas Strip and the opening of Foxwoods Resort Casino and Mohegan Sun in Connecticut in the early 1990s, along with newly built casinos in the nearby Philadelphia metro area in the 2000s, Atlantic City's tourism began to decline due to its failure to diversify away from gaming. Determined to expand, in 1999 the Atlantic City Redevelopment Authority partnered with Las Vegas casino mogul Steve Wynn to develop a new roadway to a barren section of the city near the Marina. Nicknamed "The Tunnel Project", Steve Wynn planned the proposed 'Mirage Atlantic City' around the idea that he would connect the $330 million tunnel stretching  from the Atlantic City Expressway to his new resort. The roadway was later officially named the Atlantic City-Brigantine Connector, and funnels incoming traffic off of the expressway into the city's marina district and the city of Brigantine.

Although Wynn's plans for development in the city were scrapped in 2002, the tunnel opened in 2001. The new roadway prompted Boyd Gaming in partnership with MGM/Mirage to build Atlantic City's newest casino. Borgata opened in July 2003, and its success brought an influx of developers to Atlantic City with plans for building grand Las Vegas style mega casinos to revitalize the aging city.

Owing to economic conditions and the late 2000s recession, many of the proposed mega casinos never went further than the initial planning stages. One of these developers was Pinnacle Entertainment, who purchased the Sands Atlantic City for $250–$270 million, closed it on November 11, 2006, with plans to replace it with a larger casino.  The following year, the resort was demolished in a implosion, the first of its kind in Atlantic City. While Pinnacle Entertainment intended to replace it with a $1.5–2 billion casino resort, the company canceled its construction plans and sold the land for $29.5 million. MGM Resorts International announced in October 2007 that it would pull out of all development for Atlantic City, effectively ending their plans for the MGM Grand Atlantic City.

In 2006, Morgan Stanley purchased  directly north of the Showboat Atlantic City Hotel and Casino for a new $2 billion plus casino resort. Revel Entertainment Group was named as the project's developer for the Revel Casino. Revel was hindered with many problems, the biggest setback occurring in April 2010 when Morgan Stanley, the owner of 90% of Revel Entertainment Group, decided to discontinue funding for continued construction and put its stake in Revel up for sale. Early in 2010 the New Jersey state legislature passed a bill offering tax incentives to attract new investors and complete the job, but a poll by Fairleigh Dickinson University's PublicMind released in March 2010 showed that 60% of voters opposed the legislation, and two of three of those who opposed it "strongly" opposed it. Ultimately, Governor Chris Christie offered Revel $261 million in state tax credits to assist the casino once it opened. , Revel had completed all of the exterior work and had continued work on the interior after finally receiving the funding necessary to complete construction. It had a soft opening in April 2012, and was fully open by May 2012. Ten months later, in February 2013, after serious losses and a write-down in the value of the resort from $2.4 billion to $450 million, Revel filed for Chapter 11 bankruptcy. It was restructured but still could not carry on and re-entered bankruptcy on June 19, 2014. It was put up for sale, however as no suitable bids were received the resort closed its doors on September 2, 2014. The property was bought by AC Ocean Walk, LLC for $200 million in 2017, and reopened in 2018 as Ocean Casino Resort.

In the wake of the closures and declining revenue from casinos, Governor Christie said in September 2014 that the state would consider a 2015 referendum to end the 40-year-old monopoly that Atlantic City holds on casino gambling and allowing gambling in other municipalities. With casino revenue declining from $5.2 billion in 2006 to $2.9 billion in 2013, the state saw a drop in money from its 8% tax on those earnings, which is used to fund programs for senior citizens and the disabled.

"Superstorm Sandy" struck Atlantic City on October 29, 2012, causing flooding and power-outages but left minimal damage to any of the tourist areas. The storm produced an all-time record low barometric pressure reading of 943 mb (27.85") for not only Atlantic City, but the state of New Jersey.

The Atlantic City area had the highest rates of foreclosures in the nation in 2019. This has disproportionately affected Black residents in neighborhoods segregated by redlining, a legacy that is mirrored by the values of properties on the Monopoly game board.

After several casino closures and a worldwide pandemic, strikes and pickets were being threatened in June 2022 by casino employees which were short-staffed and wanted pay raises.

Geography

According to the United States Census Bureau, Atlantic City had a total area of 17.21 square miles (44.59 km2), including 10.76 square miles (27.87 km2) of land and 6.45 square miles (16.72 km2) of water (37.50%).

The city is located on  Absecon Island, along with Ventnor City, Margate City and Longport to the southwest.

Atlantic City borders the Atlantic County municipalities of Absecon, Brigantine, Egg Harbor Township, Galloway Township, Pleasantville, and Ventnor City.

Unincorporated communities, localities and place names located partially or completely within the city include Chelsea, City Island, Great Island and Venice Park.

Climate
According to the Köppen climate classification system, Atlantic City, New Jersey, has a humid subtropical climate (Cfa) with warm, moderately humid summers, cool winters and year-around precipitation. Cfa climates are characterized by all months having an average mean temperature > 32 °F (> 0 °C), at least four months with an average mean temperature ≥ 50 °F (≥ 10 °C), at least one month with an average mean temperature ≥ 72 °F (≥ 22 °C) and no significant precipitation difference between seasons. During the summer months in Atlantic City, a cooling afternoon sea breeze is present on most days, but episodes of extreme heat and humidity can occur with heat index values ≥ 95 °F (≥ 35 °C). During the winter months, episodes of extreme cold and wind can occur with wind chill values < 0 °F (< −18 °C). The plant hardiness zone at Atlantic City Beach is 7b with an average annual extreme minimum air temperature of 11 °F (−11 °C).

Ecology
According to the A. W. Kuchler U.S. potential natural vegetation types, Atlantic City would have a dominant vegetation type of Northern Cordgrass (73) with a dominant vegetation form of Coastal Prairie (20).

Demographics

2010 census

The Census Bureau's 2006–2010 American Community Survey showed that (in 2010 inflation-adjusted dollars) median household income was $30,237 (with a margin of error of +/− $2,354) and the median family income was $35,488 (+/− $2,607). Males had a median income of $32,207 (+/− $1,641) versus $29,298 (+/− $1,380) for females. The per capita income for the city was $20,069 (+/− $2,532). About 23.1% of families and 25.3% of the population were below the poverty line, including 36.6% of those under age 18 and 16.8% of those age 65 or over.

2000 census
As of the 2000 United States census there were 40,517 people, 15,848 households, and 8,700 families residing in the city. The racial makeup of the city was 44.16% black or African American, 26.68% White, 0.48% Native American, 10.40% Asian, 0.06% Pacific Islander, 13.76% other races, and 4.47% from two or more races. 24.95% of the population were Hispanic or Latino of any race. 19.44% of the population was non-Hispanic whites.

There were 15,848 households, out of which 27.7% had children under the age of 18 living with them, 24.8% were married couples living together, 23.2% had a female householder with no husband present, and 45.1% were non-families. 37.2% of all households were made up of individuals, and 15.4% had someone living alone who was 65 years of age or older. The average household size was 2.46 and the average family size was 3.26.

In the city the age distribution of the population shows 25.7% under the age of 18, 8.9% from 18 to 24, 31.0% from 25 to 44, 20.2% from 45 to 64, and 14.2% who were 65 years of age or older. The median age was 35 years. For every 100 females, there were 96.1 males. For every 100 females age 18 and over, there were 93.2 males.

The median income for a household in the city was $26,969, and the median income for a family was $31,997. Males had a median income of $25,471 versus $23,863 for females. The per capita income for the city was $15,402. About 19.1% of families and 23.6% of the population were below the poverty line, including 29.1% of those under age 18 and 18.9% of those age 65 or over.

Economy
As of September 2014, the greater Atlantic City area had one of the highest unemployment rates in the country at 13.8%, out of a labor force of around 141,000.

Tourism district

In July 2010, Governor Chris Christie announced that a state takeover of the city and local government "was imminent". Comparing regulations in Atlantic City to an "antique car", Atlantic City regulatory reform is a key piece of Governor Chris Christie's plan, unveiled on July 22, to reinvigorate an industry mired in a four-year slump in revenue and hammered by fresh competition from casinos in the surrounding states of Delaware, Pennsylvania, Connecticut, and more recently, Maryland. In January 2011, Chris Christie announced the creation of the Atlantic City Tourism District, a state-run district encompassing the boardwalk casinos, the marina casinos, the Atlantic City Outlets, and Bader Field. Fairleigh Dickinson University's PublicMind poll surveyed New Jersey voters' attitudes on the takeover. February 16, 2011, survey showed that 43% opposed the measure while 29% favored direct state oversight. The poll also found that even South Jersey voters expressed opposition to the plan; 40% reported they opposed the measure and 37% reported they were in favor of it.

On April 29, 2011, the boundaries for the state-run tourism district were set. The district would include heavier police presence, as well as beautification and infrastructure improvements. The CRDA would oversee all functions of the district and make changes to attract new businesses and attractions. New construction has already resulted in cases of eminent domain being used to seize properties for development.

The tourism district would comprise several key areas in the city; the Marina District, Ducktown, Chelsea, South Inlet, Bader Field, and Gardner's Basin. Also included are 10 roadways that lead into the district, including several in the city's northern end, or North Beach. Gardner's Basin, which is home to the Atlantic City Aquarium, was initially left out of the tourism district, while a residential neighborhood in the Chelsea section was removed from the final boundaries, owing to complaints from the city. Also, the inclusion of Bader Field in the district was controversial and received much scrutiny from mayor Lorenzo Langford, who cast the lone "no" vote on the creation of the district citing its inclusion.

Casinos and gambling
The history of gambling in Atlantic City traces back to Prohibition and the 1920s, with racketeer Louis Kuehnle running an underground hotel and casino. Enoch "Nucky" Johnson followed and furthered Atlantic City's rise through the Roaring Twenties as a destination for drinking, gambling, and nightlife. In 1974, New Jersey voters voted 60%–40% against legalizing casino gambling at four sites statewide, but two years later approved by 56%–44% a new referendum which legalized casinos, but restricted them to Atlantic City. Resorts Atlantic City was the first casino to open, in May 1978, with a ribbon-cutting ceremony featuring Governor of New Jersey Brendan Byrne. Atlantic City is considered the "Gambling Capital of the East Coast", and currently has nine large casinos. In 2011, New Jersey's then 12 casinos employed approximately 33,000 employees, had 28.5 million visitors, made $3.3 billion in gaming revenue, and paid $278 million in taxes. They are regulated by the New Jersey Casino Control Commission and the New Jersey Division of Gaming Enforcement.

In the wake of the economic downturn following the Great Recession and the legalization of gambling in adjacent and nearby states (including Delaware, Maryland, New York, and Pennsylvania), four casino closures took place in 2014: the Atlantic Club on January 13; the Showboat on August 31; the Revel, which was Atlantic City's second-newest casino, on September 2; and Trump Plaza, which originally opened in 1984, and was the poorest performing casino in the city, on September 16.

Executives at Trump Entertainment Resorts, whose sole remaining property at the time was the Trump Taj Mahal, said in 2013 that they were considering the option of selling the Taj and winding down and exiting the gaming and hotel business. Trump Taj Mahal closed October 10, 2016, after failing to come to terms with union workers.

Caesars Entertainment executives have been reconsidering the future of their three remaining Atlantic City properties (Bally's, Caesars and Harrah's), in the wake of a Chapter 11 bankruptcy filing by the company's casino operating unit in January 2015.  In 2020, Bally's Atlantic City was acquired by Bally's Corporation. Gross gaming revenue of the city's nine operating casinos in 2022 totaled $2.79 billion, a 9% increase from from the $2.55 billion earned the previous year.

Current casinos

a The Wild Wild West Casino, which opened on July 2, 1997, and has an American Old West theme, was part of Bally's Atlantic City until 2020, when it became part of Caesars.

Renamed casinos

Closed casinos

Cancelled casinos

Boardwalk

The Atlantic City Boardwalk opened on June 26, 1870, a temporary structure erected for the summer season that was the first boardwalk in the United States.

Casino/hotels front the boardwalk, as well as retail stores, restaurants, and amusements. Notable attractions include the Boardwalk Hall, House of Blues, and the Ripley's Believe It or Not! museum.

In October 2012, Hurricane Sandy destroyed the northern part of the boardwalk fronting Absecon Inlet, in the residential section called South Inlet. The oceanfront boardwalk in front of the Atlantic City casinos survived the storm with minimal damage.

The first pier along the boardwalk, Applegate's Pier, opened in 1884. It was acquired by John L. Young in 1891, who expanded and operated it as Young's Ocean Pier, but it was mostly destroyed in a 1912 fire. The remaining part of the pier was rebuilt in 1922 as the Central Pier, which is still in operation.

A Heinz-owned pier named Heinz Pier was destroyed in the 1944 Great Atlantic Hurricane.

The most famous Atlantic City pier was Steel Pier, which opened in 1898, and which once billed itself as "The Showplace of the Nation". It closed in 1978, and was mostly destroyed in a 1982 fire. It was rebuilt in the late 1980s and is now operated as an amusement pier across from the Hard Rock.

Steeplechase Pier opened in 1899 and operated until 1986. It suffered significant damage in a 1988 fire, and the remnants of the pier were removed in 1996. The "Steeplechase Pier Heliport" on Steel Pier is named in its honor.

Captain John L. Young opened "Young's Million Dollar Pier" in 1906, and on the seaward side "erected a marble mansion", fronted by a formal garden, with lighting and landscaping designed by Young's longtime friend Thomas Alva Edison. Million Dollar Pier once rivaled Steel Pier as Atlantic City's leading pier, but after suffering decades of decline, was rebuilt into a shopping mall in the 1980s, known as "Shops on Ocean One". In 2006, the Ocean One mall was bought, renovated and re-branded as "The Pier Shops at Caesars" and in 2015, it was renamed "Playground Pier".

Garden Pier, located opposite Ocean Casino Resort, once housed a movie theater, and is now home to the Atlantic City Historical Museum.

Shopping

Atlantic City has many different shopping districts and malls, many of which are located inside or adjacent to the casino resorts. Several smaller themed retail and dining areas in casino hotels include the Borgata Shops and The Shoppes at Water Club inside Borgata, the Waterfront Shops inside of Harrah's, Spice Road inside the Trump Taj Mahal, while Resorts Casino Hotel has a small collection of stores and restaurants. Major shopping malls are also located in and around Atlantic City.

Atlantic City shops include:
 Playground Pier, an underwater-themed indoor high end shopping center located on the Million Dollar Pier formerly known as "Shops on Ocean One". The four-story shopping mall contains themed floors.
 Tanger Outlets The Walk, an outdoor outlet shopping center spanning several blocks. The only outlet mall in Atlantic County, The Walk opened in 2003 and is undergoing an expansion.
 The Quarter at Tropicana, an old Havana-themed indoor shopping center at the Tropicana, which contains over 40 stores, restaurants, and nightclubs.

Exhibition

Boardwalk Hall, formally known as the "Historic Atlantic City Convention Hall", is an arena in Atlantic City along the boardwalk. Boardwalk Hall was Atlantic City's primary convention center until the opening of the Atlantic City Convention Center in 1997. Both the Boardwalk Hall and Convention Center are operated by the Atlantic City Convention & Visitors Authority.

Arts and culture

Monopoly
Atlantic City (sometimes referred to as "Monopoly City") has become well-known over the years for its portrayal in the U.S. version of the popular board game Monopoly, in which properties on the board are named after locations in and near Atlantic City. While the original incarnation of the game did not feature Atlantic City, it was in Indianapolis that Ruth Hoskins learned the game, and took it back to Atlantic City. After she arrived, Hoskins made a new board with Atlantic City street names, and taught it to a group of friends, who ultimately passed in on to Charles Darrow, who made some modifications to the game and claimed it as his own invention. The relative prices of the places on the board reflect to some extent the social status of neighborhoods at the time, with wealthy white streets being worth more, and streets where Black and Asian residents lived being cheaper.

Marvin Gardens, the leading yellow property on the board, is actually a misspelling of the original location name, "Marven Gardens". The misspelling was said to have been introduced by Charles Todd and passed on when his home-made Monopoly board was copied by Charles Darrow and thence Parker Brothers. It was not until 1995 that Parker Brothers acknowledged this mistake and formally apologized to the residents of Marven Gardens for the misspelling, although the spelling error was not corrected.

Some of the actual locations that correspond to board elements have changed since the game's release. Illinois Avenue was renamed Martin Luther King Jr. Boulevard in the 1980s. St. Charles Place no longer exists, as the Showboat Casino Hotel was developed where it once ran.

The "Short Line" is believed to refer to the Shore Fast Line, a streetcar line that served Atlantic City, or a bus route.The B&O Railroad did not serve Atlantic City. A booklet included with the reprinted 1935 edition states that the four railroads that served Atlantic City in the mid-1930s were the Jersey Central, the Seashore Lines, the Reading Railroad, and the Pennsylvania Railroad.

The actual "Electric Company" and "Water Works" serving the city are the Atlantic City Electric Company and the Atlantic City Municipal Utilities Authority, respectively.

Attractions

Ever since Atlantic City's growth as a resort town, numerous attractions and tourist traps have originated in the city. A popular fixture in the early 20th century at the Steel Pier was horse diving, which was introduced by William "Doc" Carver. The Steel Pier featured several other novelty attractions, including the Diving Bell, human high-divers and a water circus. Advertisements for the Steel Pier in its heyday featured plaster sculptures set upon wooden bases along roads leading up to Atlantic City. By the end of World War II, many animal demonstrations declined in popularity after criticisms of animal abuse and neglect.

Rolling chairs, which were introduced in 1876 and in continuous use since 1887, have been a boardwalk fixture to this day. While powered carts appeared in the 1960s, the original and most common were made of wicker. The wicker canopied chairs-on-wheels are manually pushed the length of the boardwalk by attendants, much like a Rickshaw.

The Absecon Lighthouse is a coastal lighthouse located in the South Inlet section of Atlantic City overlooking Absecon Inlet. It is the tallest lighthouse in the state of New Jersey and is the third tallest masonry lighthouse in the United States. Construction began in 1854, with the light first lit on January 15, 1857. The lighthouse was deactivated in 1933 and although the light still shines every night, it is no longer an active navigational aid. Gardner's Basin, which is home to the Atlantic City Aquarium as well as small shops and restaurants, is located a short distance north of Absecon Light.

Since 2003, Atlantic City has hosted Thunder over the Boardwalk, an annual airshow over the boardwalk. The yearly event, a joint venture between the New Jersey Air National Guard's 177th Fighter Wing along with several casinos, attracts over 750,000 visitors each year.

Lucy is a six-story elephant-shaped example of novelty architecture, constructed of wood and tin sheeting in 1882 by James V. Lafferty in an effort to sell real estate and attract tourism. Over the years, Lucy had served as a restaurant, business office, cottage, and tavern (the last closed by Prohibition). Lucy had fallen into disrepair by the 1960s and was scheduled for demolition. The structure was moved and refurbished as a result of a "Save Lucy" campaign in 1970 and received designation as a National Historic Landmark in 1976, and is open as a museum.

Miss America pageant
Atlantic City was the home of the Miss America competition, hosting the event from its inception until 2004, and again from 2013 to 2018. The Miss America competition originated on September 7, 1921, as a two-day beauty contest, and it included state contestants as well as women from various cities around the country. The event that year was called the "Atlantic City Pageant", and the winner of the grand prize, Margaret Gorman, took home the 3-foot Golden Mermaid trophy. Gorman was not called "Miss America" until 1922, when she re-entered the pageant and lost to Mary Campbell. The pageant was initiated to extend the tourist season after the Labor Day weekend. The pageant has been nationally televised since 1954. It peaked in the early 1960s, when it was repeatedly the highest-rated program on American television. It was seen as a symbol of the United States, with Miss America often being referred to as the female equivalent of the President. The pageant's longtime emcee, Bert Parks, hosted the event from 1955 to 1979. At the Atlantic City Convention Center, there is a  interactive statue of Parks holding a crown. When a visitor puts their head inside the crown, sensors activate a recorded playback of his "There She Is..." line through speakers hidden behind nearby bushes.

An LGBT event known as the "Miss'd America Pageant" is held annually. Originally started in 1994 as a fundraiser for local LGBT charities, the event features drag queens on the runway in a similar manner to the Miss America pageant.

Boardwalk Empire

Since 2010, Boardwalk Empire, an American television series from cable network HBO set in Atlantic City during the Prohibition era, has cast a new light on the city. Starring Steve Buscemi, the show was adapted from a chapter about historical criminal kingpin Enoch "Nucky" Johnson (who is renamed "Enoch Thompson" in the show) in Nelson Johnson's book, Boardwalk Empire: The Birth, High Times, and Corruption of Atlantic City. The series was filmed in New York City at various locations that captured Atlantic City's period architecture and on a set built to resemble the Atlantic City boardwalk in the 1920s.

Around the same time of the September 2010 premiere of the show, the Press of Atlantic City created Boss of the Boardwalk, a 45-minute documentary which premiered on August 21, 2010, on NBC TV-40 and aired six additional times in the following weeks.

After the premiere of Boardwalk Empire, interest in Roaring Twenties-era Atlantic City has grown. In October 2010, a plan was revealed to renovate the ailing Resorts Casino Hotel into a Roaring Twenties theme. The re-branding was proposed by current owner Dennis Gomes, and was initiated in December 2010 when he took over the casino. The changes accentuate the resort's existing art deco design, as well as presenting new 20s-era uniforms for employees and music from the time period. The casino also introduced drinks and shows reminiscent of the period. The actual building where he lived, The Ritz-Carlton, offer tours.

In 2011, Academy Bus began a trolley tour called "Nucky's Way", a tour bus service that features actors portraying Nucky, as well as other characters, as it loops around the city. Nucky's Way is the second trolley tour to capitalize off of Boardwalk Empire, after The Great American Trolley company started a weekly tour of Atlantic City with a Roaring Twenties theme in early June 2011.

On August 1, 2011, a façade modeled after the set of Boardwalk Empire was unveiled on the boardwalk in front of an empty lot at the former site of the Trump World's Fair resort. The façade of storefronts, which consists of vinyl tacked onto three large sections of plywood, was the brainchild of longtime area radio host Pinky Kravitz, who was also a columnist for The Press of Atlantic City and host of WMGM-TV Presents Pinky on NBC40.

Beach concerts
In 2014, it was announced that Atlantic City would host two major beach concerts. The two headliners were Blake Shelton, which took place on July 31, 2015, and Lady Antebellum, which took place on August 3, 2014. On June 22, 2015, it was announced that Maroon 5 with special guest Nick Jonas and Matt McAndrew would headline on August 16, 2015. A few weeks later, it was announced that Rascal Flatts would play the second major beach concert of the summer season on August 20, 2015, with special guest Ashley Monroe. This concert would be part of their Riot Tour. Both concerts charged admission.

Festivals
In 2023, the North to Shore festival was announced, which will feature music and other entertainment at events in Asbury Park, Atlantic City and Newark throughout the month of June.

Sports

The Atlantic City Race Course in Hamilton Township was a horse racing track that operated from 1946 to 2015.

The ShopRite LPGA Classic is an LPGA Tour women's golf tournament held near Atlantic City since it started in 1986.

Professional boxing
Since February 2, 1887, the city of Atlantic City has seen 2,538 (as of September 2018) professional boxing fight programs, the first one being one with a main event fight between Willie Clark, 3-0-3, and debuting Horace Leeds, won by Clark on points over four rounds. During the 1980s, professional boxing activity boomed in Atlantic City, at times rivaling Las Vegas, Nevada, in staging major boxing fights. Fighters who fought in Atlantic City at that era include Marvelous Marvin Hagler, Thomas Hearns, Wilfredo Gómez, Jeff Chandler, Larry Holmes, George Foreman, Mike Tyson and others. Fights included The Brawl For it All, Tyson versus Holmes, Tyson versus Michael Spinks, and Roberto Durán versus Iran Barkley.

Many boxing matches were held at Donald Trump's Trump Plaza, promoted either by Bob Arum or Don King.

Parks and recreation
Atlantic City is one of five municipalities in the state—and the only one outside of Cape May County—that offer free public access to oceanfront beaches monitored by lifeguards, joining Wildwood, North Wildwood, Wildwood Crest and Upper Township's Strathmere section.

Government

Local government

Atlantic City is governed within the Faulkner Act (formally known as the Optional Municipal Charter Law) under the Mayor-Council system of municipal government (Plan D), implemented by direct petition effective as of July 1, 1982. The city is one of 71 municipalities (of the 564) statewide governed under this form. The governing body of Atlantic City is the Mayor and the City Council, all elected on a partisan basis to serve four-year terms of office as part of the November general election. The council is comprised of nine members, who are elected on a staggered basis, with one member from each of six wards and three serving at-large. The six ward seats are up for election together and the mayoral seat and the council at-large seats are up for vote together two years later. The City Council exercises the legislative power of the municipality for the purpose of holding Council meetings to introduce ordinances and resolutions to regulate City government. In addition, Council members review budgets submitted by the Mayor; provide for an annual audit of the city's accounts and financial transactions; organize standing committees and hold public hearings to address important issues which impact Atlantic City. Former Mayor Bob Levy created the Atlantic City Ethics Board in 2007, but the Board was dissolved two years later by vote of the Atlantic City Council.

, the Mayor is Marty Small Sr., whose term of office ends December 31, 2025. Small succeeded Frank M. Gilliam Jr. following his resignation on October 3, 2019. Small initially served as mayor on an interim basis for an unexpired term ending on December 31, 2021. Members of the City Council are Council President George Tibbitt (D, 2025; At-Large), Council Vice President Kaleem Shabazz (D, 2023; 3rd Ward), LaToya Dunston (D, 2023; Second Ward – elected to serve an unexpired term), Jesse O. Kurtz (Republican Party, 2023; 6th Ward), Stephanie Marshall (D, 2025; At-Large), MD Hossain Morshed (D, 2023; 4th Ward), Aaron "Sporty" Randolph (D, 2023; 1st Ward), Bruce Weekes (D, 2025; At-Large) and Muhammad "Anjum" Zia (D, 2023; 5th Ward).

In May 2020, voters rejected by a 3–1 margin a referendum that would have changed the city to a council-manager form of government which would have reduced the size of the city council and shifted responsibility for day-to-day operation from an elected mayor to an appointed city manager.

In December 2019, LaToya Dunston was selected from a list of three candidates nominated by the Democratic municipal committee to serve the remainder of the term of the Second Ward seat that had been held by Marty Small until he stepped down when he was appointed as mayor. In January 2020, Dunston was appointed to fill the Second Ward seat expiring in December 2023 that Small had won in November 2019 but declined to fill; Dunston will serve on an interim basis until the November 2020 general election, when voters will select a candidate to serve the balance of the term of office.

Mayoral disappearance and resignation
Following questions about false claims he had made about his military record, Mayor Bob Levy left City Hall in September 2007 in a city-owned vehicle for an unknown destination. After a 13-day absence, his lawyer revealed that Levy was in Carrier Clinic, a rehabilitation hospital. Levy resigned in October 2007 and then-Council President William Marsh assumed the office of Mayor and served six weeks until an interim mayor was named.

Federal, state and county representation
Atlantic City is located in the 2nd Congressional district and is part of New Jersey's 2nd state legislative district.

 

Atlantic County is governed by a directly elected county executive and a nine-member Board of County Commissioners, responsible for legislation. The executive serves a four-year term and the commissioners are elected to staggered three-year terms, of which four are elected from the county on an at-large basis and five of the commissioners represent equally populated districts. , Atlantic County's Executive is Republican Dennis Levinson, whose term of office ends December 31, 2023. Members of the Board of County Commissioners are:

Ernest D. Coursey, District 1, including Atlantic City (part), Egg Harbor Township (part), and Pleasantville (D, 2022, Atlantic City), Chair Maureen Kern, District 2, including Atlantic City (part), Egg Harbor Township (part), Linwood, Longport, Margate City, Northfield, Somers Point and Ventnor City (R, 2024, Somers Point), Andrew Parker III, District 3, including Egg Harbor Township (part) and Hamilton Township (part) (R, Egg Harbor Township, 2023), Richard R. Dase, District 4, including Absecon, Brigantine, Galloway Township and Port Republic (R, 2022, Galloway Township), James A. Bertino, District 5, including Buena, Buena Vista Township, Corbin City, Egg Harbor City, Estell Manor, Folsom, Hamilton Township (part), Hammonton, Mullica Township and Weymouth Township (R, 2018, Hammonton), Caren L. Fitzpatrick, At-Large (D, 2023, Linwood), Frank X. Balles, At-Large (R, Pleasantville, 2024) Amy L. Gatto, Freeholder (R, 2022, Hamilton Township) and Vice Chair John W. Risley, At-Large (R, 2023, Egg Harbor Township) 

Atlantic County's constitutional officers are: 
County Clerk Joesph J. Giralo (R, 2026, Hammonton),  
Sheriff Eric Scheffler (D, 2024, Northfield) and 
Surrogate James Curcio (R, 2025, Hammonton).

Politics
As of March 23, 2011, there were a total of 20,001 registered voters in Atlantic City, of which 12,063 (60.3% vs. 30.5% countywide) were registered as Democrats, 1,542 (7.7% vs. 25.2%) were registered as Republicans and 6,392 (32.0% vs. 44.3%) were registered as Unaffiliated. There were 4 voters registered to other parties. Among the city's 2010 Census population, 50.6% (vs. 58.8% in Atlantic County) were registered to vote, including 67.0% of those ages 18 and over (vs. 76.6% countywide).

In the 2012 presidential election, Democrat Barack Obama received 9,948 votes (86.6% vs. 57.9% countywide), ahead of Republican Mitt Romney with 1,548 votes (13.5% vs. 41.1%) and other candidates with 49 votes (0.4% vs. 0.9%), among the 11,489 ballots cast by the city's 21,477 registered voters, for a turnout of 53.5% (vs. 65.8% in Atlantic County). In the 2008 presidential election, Democrat Barack Obama received 10,975 votes (82.1% vs. 56.5% countywide), ahead of Republican John McCain with 2,175 votes (16.3% vs. 41.6%) and other candidates with 82 votes (0.6% vs. 1.1%), among the 13,370 ballots cast by the city's 26,030 registered voters, for a turnout of 51.4% (vs. 68.1% in Atlantic County). In the 2004 presidential election, Democrat John Kerry received 8,487 votes (74.5% vs. 52.0% countywide), ahead of Republican George W. Bush with 2,687 votes (23.6% vs. 46.2%) and other candidates with 96 votes (0.8% vs. 0.8%), among the 11,389 ballots cast by the city's 23,310 registered voters, for a turnout of 48.9% (vs. 69.8% in the whole county).

In the 2013 gubernatorial election, Democrat Barbara Buono received 4,293 ballots cast (52.6% vs. 34.9% countywide), ahead of Republican Chris Christie with 2,897 votes (35.5% vs. 60.0%) and other candidates with 63 votes (0.8% vs. 1.3%), among the 8,155 ballots cast by the city's 23,049 registered voters, yielding a 35.4% turnout (vs. 41.5% in the county). In the 2009 gubernatorial election, Democrat Jon Corzine received 4,988 ballots cast (69.9% vs. 44.5% countywide), ahead of Republican Chris Christie with 1,578 votes (22.1% vs. 47.7%), Independent Chris Daggett with 157 votes (2.2% vs. 4.8%) and other candidates with 99 votes (1.4% vs. 1.2%), among the 7,141 ballots cast by the city's 22,585 registered voters, yielding a 31.6% turnout (vs. 44.9% in the county).

City and state agencies

New Jersey Casino Control Commission

The New Jersey Casino Control Commission is a New Jersey state governmental agency that was founded in 1977 as the state's Gaming Control Board, responsible for administering the Casino Control Act and its regulations to assure public trust and confidence in the credibility and integrity of the casino industry and casino operations in Atlantic City. Casinos operate under licenses granted by the commission. The commission is headquartered in the Arcade Building at Tennessee Avenue and Boardwalk in Atlantic City.

New Jersey Division of Gaming Enforcement

The New Jersey Division of Gaming Enforcement is a division of the New Jersey Department of Law and Public Safety and is responsible for certifying casino gaming revenue, registering casino employees and non-gaming vendors, licensing gaming vendors, and handling all casino patron complaints.

Casino Reinvestment Development Authority

The CRDA was founded in 1984 and is responsible for directing the spending of casino reinvestment funds in public and private projects to benefit Atlantic City and other areas of the state. From 1985 through April 2008, CRDA spent US$1.5 billion on projects in Atlantic City and US$300 million throughout New Jersey.

Atlantic City Convention and Visitors Authority
The Convention & Visitors Authority (ACCVA) was in charge of advertising and marketing for the city as well as promoting economic growth through convention and leisure tourism development. The ACCVA managed the Boardwalk Hall and Atlantic City Convention Center, as well as the Boardwalk Welcome Center inside Boardwalk Hall and a welcome center on the Atlantic City Expressway. In 2011, the ACCVA was absorbed into the CRDA as part of the state takeover that created the tourism district.

Atlantic City Special Improvement District
The Atlantic City Special Improvement District (SID) was a nonprofit organization created in 1992, funded by a special assessment tax on businesses within the improvement district. It carried out various activities to improve the city's business community, including street cleaning and promotional efforts. In 2011, the SID was absorbed by the CRDA; the former SID boundaries would be expanded to the include all areas in the newly formed tourism district. Under the new structure, established by state legislation, the CRDA assumed responsibility for the staff, equipment and programs of the SID. The new SID division includes a SID committee made up of CRDA board members and an advisory council consisting of the current trustees and others.

Fire department

The Atlantic City Fire Department (ACFD) provides fire protection and first responder emergency medical services to the city. The ACFD operates out of six fire stations, located throughout the city in one battalion, under the command of a Battalion Chief, who in-turn reports to an on-duty Deputy Chief, or Tour Commander each shift.

Fire station locations

Police department

The city is protected by the Atlantic City Police Department, which handles 150,000 calls per year. The Chief of Police is Henry White.

Education
The Atlantic City School District serves students in pre-kindergarten through twelfth grades. As of the 2020–21 school year, the district, comprised of 11 schools, had an enrollment of 6,553 students and 617.3 classroom teachers (on an FTE basis), for a student–teacher ratio of 10.6:1. Schools in the district (with 2020–21 enrollment data from the National Center for Education Statistics) are 
Venice Park School (36 students in PreK), 
Brighton Avenue School (315 students; in grades PreK-5), 
Chelsea Heights School (332; PreK-8), 
Dr. Martin Luther King Jr. School Complex (543; PreK-8), 
New York Avenue School (548; PreK-8), 
Pennsylvania Avenue School (549; PreK-8), 
Richmond Avenue School (615; PreK-8), 
Sovereign Avenue School (696; PreK-8),
Texas Avenue School (499; K-8), 
Uptown School Complex (536; PreK-8) and 
Atlantic City High School (1,771; 9–12). Pennsylvania Avenue School opened for the 2012–2013 school year, with most students shifting from New Jersey Avenue School, which had been one of the district's oldest and most rundown schools.

Students from Brigantine, Longport, Margate City and Ventnor City attend Atlantic City High School as part of sending/receiving relationships with the respective school districts.

City public school students are also eligible to attend the Atlantic County Institute of Technology in the Mays Landing section of Hamilton Township or the Charter-Tech High School for the Performing Arts, located in Somers Point.

Oceanside Charter School, which offered pre-Kindergarten through eighth grade, was founded in 1999 and closed in June 2013 when its charter wasn't renewed by the New Jersey Department of Education.

Founded in 1908, Our Lady Star of the Sea Regional School is a Catholic elementary school, operates under the jurisdiction of the Diocese of Camden.

Nearby college campuses include those of Atlantic Cape Community College and Stockton University, the latter of which offers classes and resources in the city such as the Carnegie Library Center, which was turned back to the control of the city in April 2022.

Media outlets

Newspapers and magazines

 The Press of Atlantic City
 Atlantic City Insiders
 Atlantic City Weekly
 Casino Connection

Radio stations

 WEHA 88.7 FM – Gospel
 WAYV 95.1 FM – Top 40
 WTTH 96.1 FM – Urban AC
 WFPG 96.9 FM – AC (Lite Rock 96.9)
 WENJ 97.3 FM – Sports
 WTKU 98.3 FM – Classic hits (Kool 98.3)
 WZBZ 99.3 FM – Rhythmic (The Buzz)
 WZXL 100.7 FM – Rock (The Rock Station)
 WLRB 102.7 FM – Contemporary Christian (K-Love)
 WMGM 103.7 FM – Active rock (WMGM Rocks)
 WSJO 104.9 FM – Top 40 (Sojo 104.9)
 WPUR 107.3 FM – Country (Cat Country 107.3)
 WWJZ 640 AM – Religious
 WMID 1340 AM – Oldies
 WOND 1400 AM – News/Talk
 WPGG 1450 AM – Talk
 WBSS 1490 AM – Sports betting talk

Television stations

Atlantic City is part of the Philadelphia television market.  There, six stations licensed in the area.
WACP Channel 4 Atlantic City (Independent)
WMGM-LP Channel 7 Atlantic City (Silent) 
WMGM-TV Channel 40 Wildwood (Justice Network)
W45CP-D Channel 45 Atlantic City (Daystar)
W48DP-D Channel 48 Atlantic City (EICB TV)

Infrastructure

Transportation

Roads and highways

The three roadways that enter Atlantic City are: Black Horse Pike/Harding Highway (US 322/40 via the Albany Avenue drawbridge), White Horse Pike (US 30), and the Atlantic City Expressway through the Brigantine Connector.

Public transportation

Atlantic City is connected to other cities in several ways. NJ Transit's Atlantic City Rail Terminal at the Atlantic City Convention Center provides service from 30th Street Station in Philadelphia through several smaller South Jersey communities via the Atlantic City Line.

On June 20, 2006, the board of NJ Transit approved a three-year trial of express train service between New York Penn Station and the Atlantic City Rail Terminal. The line, known as ACES (Atlantic City Express Service), ran from February 2009 to March 2012. The approximate travel time was  hours, with a stop at Newark's Penn Station, and was part of the casinos' multimillion-dollar investments in Atlantic City. Most of the funding for the transit line was provided by Harrah's Entertainment (owners of both Harrah's Atlantic City and Caesars Atlantic City) and the Borgata.

The Atlantic City Bus Terminal is the home to local, intrastate and interstate bus companies including NJ Transit, OurBus and Greyhound bus lines. The Greyhound Lucky Streak Express offers service to Atlantic City from New York City, Brooklyn, Philadelphia, Baltimore, and Washington, D.C. In addition to stopping at the Atlantic City Bus Terminal, Greyhound buses stop at various casinos in Atlantic City. Martz Trailways provides bus service to various casinos in Atlantic City from Wilkes-Barre, Scranton, and White Haven in Pennsylvania. Klein Transportation provides bus service to various casinos in Atlantic City from Shillington, Douglassville, Royersford, and Audubon in Pennsylvania.

Within the city, public transportation is provided by NJ Transit along 13 routes, including service between the city and the Port Authority Bus Terminal in Midtown Manhattan on the 319 route, and service to and from Atlantic City on routes 501 (to Brigantine Beach), 502 (to Atlantic Cape Community College), 504 (to Ventnor Plaza), 505 (to Longport), 507 (to Ocean City), 508 (to the Hamilton Mall), 509 (to Ocean City), 551 (to Philadelphia), 552 (to Cape May), 553 (to Upper Deerfield Township), 554 (to the Lindenwold PATCO station) and 559 (to Lakewood Township).

The Atlantic City Jitney Association (ACJA) offers service on four fixed-route lines and on shuttles to and from the rail terminal.

Airline service
Many travelers also fly into Philadelphia International Airport, Trenton-Mercer Airport, or Newark Liberty International Airport, where there are wider selections of carriers from which to choose. The historic downtown Bader Field airport is now permanently closed and plans are in the works to redevelop the land.

Atlantic City International Airport is a focus city for Spirit Airlines. The airport is also served by various scheduled chartered flight companies.

Healthcare

The AtlantiCare Regional Medical Center is a health system based in Atlantic City. Founded in 1898, it includes two hospitals; the Atlantic City Campus and the Mainland Campus in Pomona, New Jersey. It has Atlantic City's only cancer institute, heart institute, and neonatal intensive care unit.

Utilities
South Jersey Industries provides natural gas to the city under the South Jersey Gas division. Marina Energy and its subsidiary, Energenic, a joint business venture with a long-time business partner, operate two thermal power stations in the city. The Marina Thermal Plant serves the Borgata while a second plant serves the Resorts Hotel and Casino. Another thermal plant is the Midtown Thermal Control Center on Atlantic and Ohio Avenues built by Conectiv, which opened in 1997 and provides chilled water for hotels and other facilities along the Boardwalk.

Electrical power in Atlantic City and its immediate surrounding area is provided primarily served Atlantic City Electric, which was incorporated in 1924 and provides power from the Beesley's Point Generating Station in Upper Township and other locations.

The Jersey-Atlantic Wind Farm, opened in 2005, is the first onshore coastal wind farm in the United States. In October 2010, North American Offshore Wind Conference was held in the city and included tours of the facility and potential sites for further development. In February 2011, the state passed legislation permitting the construction of windmills for electricity along pre-existing piers, such as the Steel Pier. The first phase of the Atlantic Wind Connection, a planned electrical transmission backbone along the Jersey Shore was planned to be operational in 2013.

In popular culture

Atlantic City has been featured in several aspects of pop culture. Films such as The King of Marvin Gardens (1972), Atlantic City, The Godfather Part III, Rounders and Snake Eyes have featured the city, as have television programs such as Mr. Belvedere, The Simpsons, How I Met Your Mother, and Boardwalk Empire.

Notable people

People who were born in, residents of, or otherwise closely associated with Atlantic City include:

 Hakeem Abdul-Shaheed (born 1959), convicted drug dealer and organized crime leader
 Jack Abramoff (born 1958), former lobbyist who was embroiled in high-profile political scandals. Abramoff was born in Atlantic City and lived there until age 10
 Robert Agnew (born 1953), professor of sociology at Emory University and president of the American Society of Criminology
 Joe Albany (1924–1988), jazz pianist
 Abdullah Anderson (born 1996), defensive end for the Atlanta Falcons
 James Avery (1945–2013), actor best known for portrayal of patriarch Philip Banks, Will Smith's character's uncle, in TV series The Fresh Prince of Bel-Air
 Harry Bacharach (1873–1947), mayor of Atlantic City in 1912 for six months, again from 1916 to 1920, and again from 1930 to 1935
 Isaac Bacharach (1870–1956), represented  from 1915 to 1937
 Edward L. Bader (1874–1927), mayor from 1920 to 1927
 Joseph Carleton Beal (1900–1967), co-writer of the Christmas song Jingle Bell Rock
 Barry Beckham (born 1944), playwright and novelist
 Edwin Blum (1906–1995), screenwriter for films Stalag 17 and The New Adventures of Tarzan
 Jack Boucher (1931–2012), photographer for National Park Service for more than 40 years beginning in 1958, chief photographer for the Historic American Buildings Survey
 Horace J. Bryant (1909–1983), first African American to serve in a State Cabinet position in New Jersey
 Benjamin Burnley (born 1978), musician, best known as lead vocalist, rhythm guitarist and primary songwriter for band Breaking Benjamin
 Greg Buttle (born 1954), linebacker who played in the NFL for the New York Jets
 Mark H. Buzby (born 1956), former United States Navy rear admiral who serves as Administrator of the United States Maritime Administration
 Carole Byard (1941–2017), visual artist and illustrator of children's books, who was the recipient of a Caldecott Medal and multiple Coretta Scott King Awards
 Harry Carroll (1892–1962), songwriter who composed music for "I'm Always Chasing Rainbows", "The Trail of the Lonesome Pine" and "By the Beautiful Sea"
 Rosalind Cash (1938–1995), actress nominated for an Emmy Award for PBS production of Go Tell It on the Mountain
 Rocky Castellani (1926–2008), middleweight boxer best known for split-decision loss to Sugar Ray Robinson in which he knocked Robinson down in the sixth round
 Vera Coking, property owner who prevailed in her battle to oppose Donald Trump's efforts to acquire her boarding house using eminent domain
 Jack Collins (born 1943), Speaker of the New Jersey General Assembly from 1996 until 2002, making him the longest-serving speaker in Assembly history
 Lawrence J. Delaney (born 1935), scientist and businessman who served as Assistant Secretary of the Air Force (Acquisition)
 Stuart Dischell (born 1954), poet and professor of English at University of North Carolina at Greensboro
 Bruce Ditmas (born 1946), jazz drummer and percussionist
 Sidney Drell (1926–2016), theoretical physicist and arms control expert
 Robert Ettinger (1918–2011), academic, known as "the father of cryonics" based on the impact of his 1962 book The Prospect of Immortality
 Frank S. Farley (1901–1977), member of New Jersey Legislature for 34 years, boss of Republican political machine that controlled the Atlantic City and Atlantic County governments
 Vera King Farris (1938–2009), third president of Stockton University
 Andrew Fields, collegiate basketball coach and a retired professional basketball player
 Chris Ford (born 1949), head coach of the Boston Celtics, Milwaukee Bucks, Los Angeles Clippers and Philadelphia 76ers
 Helen Forrest (1917–1999), singer for three of the most popular big bands of the Swing Era, earning reputation as "the voice of the name bands"
 Anne Francine (1917–1999), actress and cabaret singer
 John F. Gaffney (1934–1995), politician who served in the New Jersey General Assembly, where he represented the 2nd Legislative District from 1992 until his death
 John J. Gardner (1845–1921), represented New Jersey's 2nd congressional district from 1885 to 1893, mayor of Atlantic City 1868–1875
 Patsy Garrett (1921–2015), actress
 Milton W. Glenn (1903–1967), represented New Jersey's 2nd congressional district from 1957 to 1965
 William Green (born 1979), NFL running back who played for the Cleveland Browns
 Marjorie Guthrie (1917–1983), dancer of the Martha Graham Company and dance teacher who was the wife of folk musician Woody Guthrie
 John R. Hargrove Sr. (1923–1997), federal judge appointed by President Ronald Reagan to the United States District Court for the District of Maryland
 Celestine Tate Harrington (1956–1998), quadriplegic street musician known for playing keyboard with her lips, teeth and tongue on the Atlantic City boardwalk
 James Hillman (1926–2011), developer of archetypal psychology
 Pete Hunter (born 1980), cornerback who played in the NFL for the Seattle Seahawks
 Walter S. Jeffries (1893–1954), represented  from 1939 to 1941
 Candy Jones (1925–1990), fashion model, writer and radio talk show host
 Allan Kaprow (1927–2006), painter and pioneer in establishing concepts of performance art, who influenced Fluxus
 Amy Kennedy (born 1978), educator, mental health advocate and politician who is the Democratic Party nominee in the 2020 elections seeking to represent New Jersey's 2nd congressional district
 Marie Kibler (1912–1978), artistic gymnast who competed at the 1936 Summer Olympics and placed fifth with the American team
 Pinky Kravitz (1927–2015), radio broadcaster and print journalist who hosted "Pinky's Corner" on WOND from an array of Atlantic City locations from 1958 until a few months before his death in 2015, hosted "WMGM presents Pinky!" for years on WMGM-TV and wrote columns for many periodicals including The Press of Atlantic City
 Martha Krebs, theoretical physicist who directed the Office of Science and Technology Policy for the United States Department of Energy and is the founding director for the California NanoSystems Institute at UCLA
 JoAnna LaSane (1935–2019), model, dancer and arts administrator
 Lee B. Laskin (born 1936), attorney, politician and judge who served in both houses of the New Jersey Legislature before being appointed to serve on the New Jersey Superior Court
 Jacob Lawrence (1917–2000), artist known for depicting African-American life in his paintings. Born on Arctic Avenue
 E. Grey Lewis (1940–2005), lawyer who served as General Counsel of the Navy
 Bill Libby (1927–1984), sportswriter and biographer best known for his books on sports, including 65 on sports figures
 James J. McCullough (born 1942), politician who served in the New Jersey Senate from 2007 to 2008, where he represented the 2nd Legislative District
 Don McGahn (born 1968), White House Counsel and Assistant to the President for U.S. President Donald Trump and a former Commissioner of the United States Federal Election Commission
 Bob Merrill (1921–1998), songwriter and screenwriter
 John P. O'Neill (1952–2001), FBI terrorist specialist who was director of security at the World Trade Center and died in the September 11th, 2001 terrorist attacks
 Joshua Ozersky (1967–2015), food writer and historian
 Chris Pallies (1957–2019), professional wrestler known as King Kong Bundy
 Reese Palley (1922–2015), “Merchant to the Rich”, entrepreneur, art dealer, writer, and sailor
 Joseph B. Perskie (1885–1957), Associate Justice of the New Jersey Supreme Court from 1933 to 1947
 Monique Samuels, television personality best known as a cast member of the reality television series The Real Housewives of Potomac
 Jeremy Slate (1926–2006), actor and songwriter
 Alfredo Silipigni (1932–2006), conductor and founder of New Jersey State Opera
 George Smathers (1913–2007), United States Senator from Florida
 Dave Thomas (1932–2002), founder of Wendy's fast-food restaurant, was born in Atlantic City
 Jean Webster (1935–2011), cook who operated Sister Jean's Kitchen, a soup kitchen serving free meals to the poor of Atlantic City
 Jim Whelan (1948–2017), member of State Senate who represented the 2nd Legislative District until his death and was Mayor of Atlantic City from 1990 to 2001
 Norman Joseph Woodland (1921–2012), inventor of the barcode
 Albert Zugsmith (1910–1993), film producer

See also
 Atlantic City Sandpipers
 Chicken Bone Beach
 Kentucky Avenue Renaissance Festival

Notes

References

Further reading
 Johnson, Nelson. Boardwalk Empire: The Birth, High Times, and Corruption of Atlantic City (2010); Popular history tied to TV series
 Paulsson, Martin. The Social Anxieties of Progressive Reform: Atlantic City, 1854-1920. (NYU Press, 1996).
 Simon, Bryant. Boardwalk of Dreams: Atlantic City and the Fate of Urban America (2004); Scholarly study

External links

 

 
1854 establishments in New Jersey
Cities in Atlantic County, New Jersey
Faulkner Act (mayor–council)
Gambling in New Jersey
Jersey Shore communities in Atlantic County
New Jersey culture
Populated places established in 1853
Tourism in New Jersey